Yates Glacier is a glacier 3 miles (4.8 km) south of Matheson Glacier, discharging into the west side of Lehrke Inlet on the east coast of Palmer Land. It was named by United Kingdom Antarctic Place-Names Committee (UK-APC) after JohnYates, a British Antarctic Survey (BAS) surveyor, based at Stonington Island Base E, who worked in the general vicinity of this feature from 1972 to 1974.

References

Glaciers of Palmer Land